"40%" is a song by Aya Nakamura. It was released on 22 November 2019.

Charts

Certifications

References

2019 songs
2019 singles
Aya Nakamura songs
Songs written by Aya Nakamura